The Apeejay Surrendra Group is an Indian business conglomerate that was founded in 1910 in Jalandhar by Lala Pyare Lal. In 1951 the headquarters relocated to Kolkata. Surrendra Paul was chairman from 1982 until his murder in 1989. Most of the current senior executives are members of his family.

The companies in the Apeejay Surrendra Group collectively employ 43,000 people. The businesses are tea plantations, fast-moving consumer goods, tea brands, shipping, boutique hotels, commercial real estate, warehousing, business centres, retail brands, bookstores, tea rooms, marine cluster, logistics parks and knowledge parks.

References

Companies based in Kolkata
Tea companies of India
Conglomerate companies established in 1910
Conglomerate companies of India
Indian companies established in 1910